Bertram Bangsted Kvist (born 19 March 2005) is a Danish professional footballer who plays for Brøndby. He has represented Denmark at youth levels.

Career

Brøndby
Kvist is known as a lifelong Brøndby IF supporter, being a season-ticket holder at Sydsiden Stand at Brøndby Stadium among other hardcore fans.

On 16 June 2022, Kvist signed a three-year contract with Brøndby which tied him to the club until the summer 2025. He was officially promoted to the first team during 2022–23 pre-season and handed the number 32 shirt. A few weeks later Bertram swapped to shirt number 19 with Frederik Alves who took over number 32 which he prefers.

He made his professional debut on 24 July 2022 at the age of 17 years and 127 days during the second matchday of the 2022–23 season in the Danish Superliga at Brøndby Stadium against Nordsjælland

International career 
Kvist is a youth international for Denmark, having gained caps for the Denmark under-16, under-17 and under-18's.

Career statistics

References

External links
 
 

2005 births
Living people
People from Dragør Municipality
Association football forwards
Danish men's footballers
Denmark youth international footballers
Danish Superliga players
Brøndby IF players
Sportspeople from the Capital Region of Denmark